Antilliaanse Feesten is a Caribbean music festival that takes place in every second weekend of August in Hoogstraten, Belgium. It had 38,000 attendees in 2016. The festival was first held in 1983, and has been repeated every year except 2000.

The artists presents music from different countries and genres:
Bachata, Champeta, Cumbia, Compas, Merengue, Dancehall, Reggae, Reggaeton, Salsa, Ska, Soca, Soukous, Timba, Vallenato and Zouk

Program / Line Up

2018
Acido Pantera • Electronic Latin | Colombia - Broederliefde • Reggaeton | Nederland - Carlyn Xp • Soca | Dominica - Carmel Zoum • African Dancehall | France/Congo - Ce'cile • Dancehall | Jamaïca - Charles King • Champeta | Colombia - Daddy Yankee • Reggaeton | Puerto Rico - David Kada • Salsa | Dominicaanse Republiek - Descemer Bueno • Latin Music | Cuba - Diblo Dibala • Soukous | Kongo - Eddy Kenzo • Happy African Music For Dancing | Uganda - Ephrem J • Bachata | Curaçao - Gentz • Salsa, Merengue And Kizomba | Curaçao - Grupo Niche • Salsa | Colombia - Jacob Desvarieux • Zouk | Guadeloupe - Kaï (Ex Carimi) • Compas | Haïti - Kumbia Boruka • Kumbia | Mexico, France - Nelson Freitas • Kizomba | Kaapverdië - Original Burning Flames • Soca | Antigua - Tabou Combo • Compas | Haïti - The Dubbeez • Reggae | Nederland - Troy • Dancehall | Cuba - Zalama Crew • Hip Hop | Colombia

2017
Baby Lores • Cubaton | Cuba - Baloji • Soukous | Belgium, Congo - Blend Mishkin • Reggae | Greece - Divan • Cubaton | Cuba - Doble R • Classical Latin | Curaçao - El Mura Y Su Timbre Latino • Timba, Salsa | Cuba - Farmer Nappy • Soca | Trinidad En Tobago - Fruko y sus Tesos • Colombian Salsa | Colombia - Grupo Extra • Bachata | Zwitserland, Dominican Republic - Impact • Reggae, Jazz, House | Nederland - J Alvarez • Reggaeton | Puerto Rico - Kassav' • Zouk | Guadeloupe - Kd Soundsystem • Dancehall, Kuduro | Nederland - Kenny B • Reggaeton | Nederland, Suriname - La Dame Blanche • Dancehall, Hip Hop, Dancehall, Reggae | Cuba - La Inédita • Cumbia, Raggamuffin | Peru - Lina Ice • Reggaeton | Nederland - Marvay • Soca | Barbados - Michel “El Buenón” • Salsa | Dominican Republic - Pegasaya • Salsa Showband | Nederland - Rebels Band • Soca | St. Eustatius - Shaggy • Reggae & Dancehall | Jamaica - Twister El Rey • Champeta (Soukous, Compass, Zouk, Soca, Calipso) | Colombia - Wilfrido Vargas • Merengue | Dominican Republic - Young Cosje • Kaseko | Suriname

2016
12 August 2016
La-33 - Salsa (Colombia)
Frank Reyes - Bachata (Dominican Republic)
Kinito Mendez - Merengue (Dominican Republic)
Locomondo - Reggae, Ska (Greece)
Rupee - Soca (Barbados)
Troy Y La Familia - Salsa, Timba (Cuba)
Nd - Soukous (Congo)
Pegasaya - Salsa, Merengues, Bachata (Nederland)
B.M.W. (Brothers Making Wisdom) - Soca & Reggae (Aruba)
Nastyplay - Bachata & Zouk (Nederland)
New Style - Julie Music (Suriname)
Systema Solar - Colombian Afro Reggaeton, Cumbia, Champeta) (Colombia)
Zwartwerk -  Hip Hop, Zouk, Kuduro (Belgium, Angola, Congo)
13 August 2016
Oscar D'leon - Salsa (Venezuela)
Alexander Abreu & Havana D'primera - Salsa (Cuba)
Diblo Dibala - Soukous At Its Best !!! (Congo)
Tizzy & El A Kru - Soca (Antigua & Barbuda)
B.M.W. (Brothers Making Wisdom) - Soca & Reggae (Aruba)
Broederliefde - Reggaeton (Nederland)
Cache Royale - Latin Showband (Curaçao)
Ephrem J - Bachata (Curaçao)
Los Desiguales - Latin Pop (Cuba)
Postmen - Hip-Hop Reggaeton (Nederland)
Typhoon - Rap - Nederlands (Surinam)
Young F - Reggaeton (Colombia)

2015
7 August 2015
Grupo Niche - Salsa (Colombia)
Kes The Band - Reggae (Trinidad En Tobago)
Silvestre Dangond - Vallenato (Colombia)
Mr. Vegas - Rasta, Reggae (Jamaica)
Tizzy & El a Kru - Soca (Trinidad and Tobago)
Popcaan - Dancehall (Jamaica)
Laritza Bacallao - Cubaton (Cuba)
Bazurto All Stars - Congolese Soukous (Colombia)
Chacal Y Yakarta - Cubaton, Reggaeton (Cuba)
Hollie Cook - Ska, Reggae (United Kingdom)
Kankantrie - Rhythms Of Central-Afrika (Surinam)
Gato Preto - Kuduro With Rhytims From Afrika (Mozambique, Ghana)
Napalma - Electro (Mozambique, Brasil)
8 August 2015
Haila - Musica Cubana (Cuba)
El Adolescent's Reencuentro - Salsa (Venezuela)
Henry Mendez - Merengue, Reggaeton (Dominican Republic)
Toby Love - Bachata (Dominican Republic)
Merengue All Stars - Mambo, Merengue (Dominican Republic, USA)
El Micha - Cubaton, Salsa (Cuba)
Cache Royale - Salsa Showband (Curaçao)
Rebels Band - Soca (St. Eustatius)
Ghetto Flow - Reggaeton (Nederland)
La Dame Blanche - Hip Hop Cumbia (Cuba)
Satisfaction - Calypso, Soca (Aruba)
Extazz - Salsa, Merengue Showband (Nederland)
Septeto Nabori - Musica Cubana (Cuba)

2014
8 August 2014
Osmani Garcia - Reggaeton (Cuba)
Grupo Galé - Salsa (Colombia)
Fay-Ann Lyons (Trinidad)
Kassav & Guests - Zouk (Zoukmachine, Luc Leandry, Jean-Marc Ferdinand) (Guadeloupe, Martinique)
Salsa Celtica (Scotland)
Duban Bayona & Jimmy Zambrano (Colombia)
'La Z-One - Soukous (Belgium)]]
B.M.W. (Aruba)
Kollision Band (St.Kitts & Nevis)
Grupo Extra (Dominican Republic)
9 August 2014
N'klabe - Salsa (Puerto Rico)
Fuego - Merengue (Dominican Republic)]]
Gente D'zona - Reggaeton (Cuba)
Bunji-Garlin - Soca (Trinidad)
Burning Flames - Soca (Antigua)
Carimi Ft Mikabem - Compas (Haïti, USA)
Palenka Soultribe - electronic sounds with Afro-Colombian rhythms and melodies (Colombia)
The Skints - Reggae(United Kingdom)
Aptijt (Suriname)
Herencia De Timbiqui (Colombia)
Mr. Black (Colombia)
David Kada (Dominican Republic)

2013
9 August 2013	
Daddy Yankee
Guayacan
Cubaton All Stars
Fulanito
Rikki Jai 
The Selecter
Kumbia Queers 
Rebels Band
Bomba Estéreo
Freddy Loco feat. Vin Gordon 	
10 August 2013	
Kassav'
Kes the Band 	
Ce'cile
Charanga Habanera
Jimmy Saa 	
Azucar Negra
RKM Y KEN-Y
Shakalewa 
Kuenta y Tambú (KIT)
Staff des Leaders
Grupo Extra 
Kevin Florez

2012
10 August 2012
20:45 	Morgan Heritage
22:45 	Henry Santos (Aventura)
00:45 	Carimi
02:45 	Havana d'Primera
20:15 	Bella Mondo
22:15 	Celso Piña
00:15 	Ferre Gola
02:15 	Destra Garcia
20:45 	Recruitz Soca Band
23:00 	Locomondo
01:15 	KLC Clave Cubana
11 August 2012
19:45 	Tony Dize
21:30 	Diomedes Diaz
23:15 	Luis Enrique
01:30 	Destra Garcia
03:30 	Konata
20:00 	La Fiesta & Kayente
22:00 	Locomondo
00:15 	Kola Loka
02:15 	Angeles Bendecidos
21:00 	Xamanek
23:15 	Staff des Leaders
01:30 	Punky Donch

2011
12 August 2011
20:45 	Silvio Mora
22:45 	Yuri Buenaventura
01:00 	Don Omar
02:45 	Roy Cape All Stars
20:15 	Damaru & App'tijt
22:15 	Choc Quib Town
00:15 	Kewdy de los Santos
02:00 	Yumuri
21:00 	Kuenta y Tambú (KIT)
23:15 	El Micha
01:30 	Rebels Band
13 August 2011
19:45 	Alex Bueno
21:30 	Werrason
23:15 	Grupo Galé
01:15 	Machel Montano
03:30 	Rebels Band
20:15 	Punky Donch
22:15 	Roy Cape All Stars
00:30 	Queen Ifrica & Tony Rebel
02:30 	Manolin "El Medico de la Salsa"
21:00 	Sonambulo
23:15 	La Pinata
01:30 	Solo Dos

2010
13 August 2010
19:45 	K-Liber
21:00 	Willy Chirino
23:00 	Mr. Vegas
01:00 	Wyclef Jean
02:45 	Triple Kay
21:30 	Los 4
23:30 	Tizzy & El a Kru
01:15 	Maykel Blanco
21:00 	Cumbia Cosmonauts
23:15 	Young Livity
01:30 	B.M.W.
14 August 2010
20:30 	Michel Batista
22:45 	Los Rabanes ft. Osvaldo Ayala
01:00 	Jorge Celedon
03:00 	Tizzy & El a Kru
20:00 	Triple Kay
22:00 	Gwatinik. feat. Tina Ly
00:15 	Toby Love
02:30 	La Rouge
21:00 	La Monareta
23:15 	Rebels Band
01:30 	Grupo Extra

2009
14 August 2009
20:30 	Alex Bello
22:15 	Magia Caribena
00:30 	Carlos Vives
02:30 	Bamboolaz
21:45 	Desorden Publico
23:45 	Destra Garcia
02:00 	Havana d'Primera
21:15 	Staff des Leaders
22:45 	DJ Saca la Mois
23:30 	KLC Clave Cubana
00:45 	DJ Saca la Mois
01:30 	Youth X-treme
03:00 	DJ Eduardo
15 August 2009
20:15 	Michael Stuart
22:00 	Milly Quezada
23:45 	Kassav'
01:30 	Tego Calderon
03:00 	Destra Garcia
19:30 	App'tijt
21:30 	Elito Revé
23:45 	Aimelia Lias
02:00 	Youth X-treme
21:00 	Sindicato Sonico
22:30 	DJ Saca la Mois
23:15 	Pannonia Allstars Ska Orchestra
00:45 	DJ Saca la Mois
01:30 	Bomba Estéreo
03:00 	DJ Mystique

2008
Entry per day :  Entry per weekend, 

The festival organization co-organized the Marc Anthony concert on June 19 at Sportpaleis in Antwerp.

Grupo Galé (salsa colombienne)
Monchy Y Alexandra (bachata)
Wisin y Yandel (reggaetón)
Gente d'Zona (reggaetón)
Carimi (kompa)
Binomio de Oro (vallenato)
Chichi Peralta
Maravilla de Florida
Djunny Claude
Magia Caribena
3 Canal
Small Axe Band
T-Strong
Rodry-Go
Rocola Bacalao
ATNG Soca Band

2007
La India 
Charanga Habanera 
Monchy Y Alexandra
Kassav' 
N'Klabe
Joe Arroyo 
Pitbull 
Oro Solido 
Karamelo Santo
Haila y su Orquesta 
Eddy-K
Le Groove 
Machel Montano 
J-F Ifonge 
Combinatie XVI 
Inner Visions 
Ghetto Flow 
BMW Plus

2006
11 August 2006
21:30 	Los Corraleros de Majagual
23:30 	Orishas
01:30 	Issac Delgado
21:30 	Triple Kay
23:30 	Youth X-treme
01:30 	DJ Chen
20:30 	App'tijt
22:30 	Willie Colon
00:30 	Magic System
02:30 	T-Vice
12 August 2006
19:45 	BMW
21:30 	Magia Caribena
22:30 	Krezi Mizik
01:30 	La 33
21:30 	Bambu Station
22:30 	Immo
01:30 	J-F Ifonge
20:30 	Paulo Fg y su Elite
22:30 	Amarfis y su bande de Attakke
00:30 	Jerry Rivera
02:45 	Triple Kay
Indoor Festival 2006
18 mars 2006
22:00 	Kassav'
23:30 	Elvis Crespo
01:00 	Los Van Van

2005
12 August 2005
20:30 	Wezon
22:30 	Johnny Pacheco
00:30 	Carimi
02:30 	Victor Manuelle
20:00 	New System Brass
21:30 	Osvaldo Ayala
23:30 	Era
01:30 	Pablo Bachata
21:30 	Midnight Groovers
22:30 	Mark Foggo Skasters
ù13 August 2005
20:30 	Carimi
22:30 	Don Omar
00:30 	Rikarena
02:30 	Wezon
19:45 	Panteon Rococo
21:30 	Midnight Groovers
23:30 	Los Gigantes Del Vallenato
01:30 	Salsa Celtica
21:30 	Proyecto Secreto
23:30 	BMW
Indoor Festival 2005:21 mars 2005
22:10 	Aventura
22:20 	Sergio Vargas
22:30 	Pachito Alonso
22:40 	K-Liber

2004
13 August 2004
20:30 	Krosfyah
22:30 	Fernando Villalona
00:30 	Gilberto Santa Rosa
02:30 	Ivan Villazon
20:00 	Young Cosje
21:30 	Ricardo Lemvo
22:30 	Carimi
01:30 	Awilo Longomba
21:30 	Internationals
23:15 	Gabriel Rios
01:00 	Squadra Bossa Ft. Buscemi
14 August 2004
20:30 	Fruko y sus Tesos
22:30 	Aventura
00:30 	Krispy y su Bombazo Tipico
02:30 	Krosfyah
19:30 	Ska Cubano
21:30 	Michele Henderson
23:30 	Cubanito 20.02
01:30 	Orlando "Maraca" Valle
21:30 	Clan 537
23:15 	K-Liber & MC Farah
01:30 	The Dill Brothers
Indoor Festival 2004 : 15 mars 2004
22:40 	Amarfis y su bande de Attakke
22:50 	Guayacan
23:00 	Juanes
23:10 	Africando

2003
8 August 2003
20:30 	Square One
22:30 	Ng La Banda
00:30 	Carimi
02:30 	Kinito Mendez
21:30 	Monchy Y Alexandra
23:30 	Olivier N'Goma
01:30 	Los de Abajo
9 August 2003
20:30 	Guaco
22:30 	Los Diablitos
00:30 	Grupo Mania
02:30 	Square One
19:30 	Clan 537
21:30 	App'tijt
23:30 	Buscemi Live
01:30 	La Barriada
Indoor Festival 2003:11 March 2003
21:20 	Bamboleo
21:30 	Mala Fe
21:40 	Oscar d'Leon
21:50 	Kassav'

2002
José Alberto "El Canario"
Fulanito
Paulo FG y su Elite 
Gabino Pampini
Cana Brava
Binomio de Oro
Manikkomio 
X-Plosion 
Aramis Galindo 
Bose Krioro 
Roy Cape All Stars 
International Garifuna Band 
Champeta All Stars 
Luc Leandry

2001
Sonora Carruseles
Kassav'
Sierra Maestra
Fulanito
Puerto Rican Power
Toros Band 
Guayacan
Salsa Celtica
Conjunto Chappottin
Samy y Sandra Sandoval 
Arnell I Orkesta 
Ondrofeni 
Joseph Portes 
Youth Waves 
Garifuna All Stars

1999
Celia Cruz
Maraca
José Alberto "El Canario"
Alfredo de La Fe
Kassav'
Grupo Galé
Kinito Mendez (merengue)
Banda Chula (merengue)
Grupo Mania (merengue)

1998
El Gran Combo 
Orquesta Revé
Tabou Combo
Krosfyah 
Bana OK

1997
Oscar d'Leon
Africando
Dan Den
Klimax (timba)
Tabou Combo
Los Hermanos Rosario (merengue)
Son Damas 
Alfredo Gutierrez 
Bredda David 
Blue Ventures 
La India Canela

1996
Charanga Habanera
Grupo Niche 
Kinito Mendez
Coco Band
Anacaona
Reasons Orchestra 
Taxi Kreol 
Antonio Rivas 
Andy Palacio

1995
Joe Arroyo y La Verdad 
Fruko & The Latin Brothers 
NG La Banda
Wilfrido Vargas
Original de Manzanillo
Kali 
Zaiko Langa Langa 
Eclipse Steelband
Orquesta d'Cache 
La Muralla 
Double Rock Kawina 
Rico Rodriguez 
Diblo Dibala
Academy Brass International 
Sampling 
Roy Cape & The Kaiso All Stars 
Carlo Jones 
Yakki Famirie 
Fefita La Grande

1993
Sierra Maestra
Tabou Combo
Fernando Villalona
Toumpak 
Pride 
Skiffle Bunch 
La Fuerza Mayor 
Imaginations Brass

1992
The Skatalites
Coco Band
Exile One 
Touch 
Opo Doti & A Sa Go 
Dixie Band 
Massive Chandelier 
Tipica Manzana 
Grupo Stabiel

1991
Gazolinn' 
Gabby & Gryner 
Bati Kibra 
Derrick Morgan 
La Gran Manzana 
Koropina 
Reasons Orchestra 
Huracan

1990
Laurel Aitken
Arrow
Ramon Orlando 
Tuco Bouzi & Dixie Band 
Heartbeat 
Caribbean Combo

1989
Gypsy 
Vega Band 
Ebony Steelband 
July Mateo "Rasputin" 
TC & The Playboys 
J.M. Cambrimol & La Maafia

1988
Wilfrido Vargas 
Dede St Prix
Imaginations Brass 
Unisono / Heat Heat

1987
Arrow
Bomba 
Calypso Rose 
Pier' Rosier & Gazoline

1986
Las Chicas Del Can
Trinidad Troubadours 
Panvibes Steelband
Bachanal

1985
GI's Brass International 
Quicksilver

1984
Flash Tropical Steels / Macay 
Sensacion Latina

1983
Electric Ananas 
Cosecha

References

Homepage of AntilliaanseFeesten.be 
 

Music festivals in Belgium
Summer events in Belgium